Aman Home,Mahuawa is a village in East Champaran district in the Indian state of Bihar.

Demographics
As of 2011 India census, Mahuawa had a population of 3419 in 589 households. Males constitute 51.59% of the population and females 48.4%. Mahuawa has an average literacy rate of 43.28%, lower than the national average of 74%: male literacy is 60.8%, and female literacy is 39.1%. In Mahuawa, 21.64% of the population is under 6 years of age.

References

Villages in West Champaran district